Greece on the Ruins of Missolonghi is an 1826 oil painting by French painter Eugène Delacroix, and now preserved at the Musée des Beaux-Arts de Bordeaux. This painting was inspired by the Third Siege of Missolonghi by the Ottoman forces in 1826, during which many people of the city after the long-time siege (almost a year) decided to attempt a mass breakout (sortie) to escape famine and epidemics. The attempt resulted in a disaster, with the larger part of the Greeks slain.

Analysis
Greece is depicted as a kneeling woman who occupies the major part of the painting. She is wearing a traditional Greek costume, her chest being widely bare, and she spreads her arms as a sign of sadness. The hand of a dead victim can be seen protruding from the rubble, beneath her feet. In the background, a dark-complexioned man wearing a yellow turban, who symbolizes the enemy, is planting a flag in the ground.

The painting borrows elements from Christianity. Indeed, "Greece adopts the attitude of praying in the early centuries of Christianity. The blue coat and white robe, traditionally attributed to the Immaculate Conception, reinforces this analogy to a secular figure of Mary here. The strength of the image is the sharp contrast between the traditional allegory which induces an idealization of the model, and processing of the scene without any concession to the ideal."

References

1826 paintings
Paintings by Eugène Delacroix
Paintings about the Greek War of Independence
19th-century allegorical paintings
Allegorical paintings by French artists